Eysey Footbridge is a footbridge across the River Thames in England, at Eysey, just below Cricklade, Wiltshire. It is one of the first bridges at the upper end of the Thames Path.

The bridge is to the south of Eysey which is in modern local demography, after the departure of agricultural labourers' tied cottages, synonymous with Eysey Manor: a grand house and mixed farm.

East of here the river separates the civil parishes of Cricklade and Latton (to the north); but the Church of England parish of Cricklade spans both banks. About 500 metres to the east of the south-east bank are fields of Castle Eaton. The Key joins the Thames upstream of the bridge.

See also
List of crossings of the River Thames

References

Pedestrian bridges across the River Thames
Bridges in Wiltshire
Cricklade